Mayor Adam West, or simply Mayor West, was a fictional character and voiced by the real Adam West (as a fictionalised version of himself) in the American animated television series and franchise Family Guy. Depicted as the mayor of the town of Quahog, Rhode Island, where the show is set, he appeared on a recurring basis from his first appearance in the second season until his final appearance in the seventeenth season.

Character  
Mayor West was characterized as an intense yet friendly, soft-spoken, childish, immature crackpot whose delusions often came at great expense and even danger to citizens of Quahog. His psychotic whims include dispatching the entire Quahog police department to Cartagena, Colombia, to search for the fictional character Elaine Wilder from the 1984 film Romancing the Stone, or wasting city council money on a solid gold statue of the Dig 'Em frog, and cementing coffins since he was afraid the dead will return as zombies. West was never revealed in the show as belonging to any specific political party, suggesting political ambiguity.

In the episode "420", he legalizes marijuana after listening to a song Brian sings ("A Bag o' Weed"), only to re-criminalize it a few days later when Brian is bribed to sing a song condemning the substance. In another episode, West prepares to sign a same-sex marriage ban only to be taken hostage in his office by an angry Brian who supports same-sex marriage and aims to thwart West's intentions. He was also a brainwashed Russian sleeper spy activated by the phrase "Gosh, that Italian family at the next table sure is quiet". In the episode "Brothers & Sisters", he marries Lois' sister Carol. In "Road to the Multiverse", it is revealed that he is 95% helium. The episode "Dr. C and the Women" suggests he is fully sane and his bizarre antics are actually a smokescreen to throw people off and cover up a dark, murderous side.

Development

Family Guy creator Seth MacFarlane wrote several episodes of the cartoon series Johnny Bravo. West played a similarly odd rendition of himself in an episode written by MacFarlane, "Johnny Meets Adam West!", first broadcast in December 1997. In the episode, West's fictionalized persona displays similar deluded characteristics to the later Family Guy character, such as believing a race of megalomaniac mole-people lives under a local golf course. However, he dressed formally and behaved slightly similarly to his character in the 1960s series of Batman. MacFarlane found West's character and performance in Johnny Bravo so funny that he created a similar character for Family Guy.

Following the real Adam West's death on June 9, 2017, Mayor West died offscreen in Family Guy as revealed in the episode "Adam West High". Following his death, MacFarlane said, "Family Guy has lost its mayor. He is irreplaceable". Producer Steve Callaghan told Entertainment Weekly that there were still five unaired episodes featuring West that would air in the upcoming season. Callaghan revealed that they had not decided how they were going to address the departure of West's character from the series, while also revealing that it is something they have been dealing with concerning the loss of Carrie Fisher in December 2016. Callaghan went on to say that both the departures of Fisher and West from the show will certainly reflect the importance that each of their characters and actors had within the series.

Starting in the episode "Wild Wild West", West's position as Mayor of Quahog was assumed by the character's western rural cousin, Wild West, who is voiced by Sam Elliott.

References

External links
 Adam West on IMDb

Family Guy characters
Television characters introduced in 2000
Cultural depictions of Adam West
Fictional mayors
Animation based on real people
Fictional characters based on real people
Fictional characters with schizophrenia
Animated human characters
Male characters in animated series
Male characters in television
Characters created by Seth MacFarlane